Paul McShane may refer to:

 Paul McShane (footballer) (born 1986), Irish football player
 Paul McShane (rugby league) (born 1989), rugby league footballer

See also
Paul Shane (1940–2013), British comic actor